William Lancaster may refer to:

 William de Lancaster I, or William Fitz Gilbert, was a nobleman of the twelfth century in Northwest England
 William Lancaster (Queen's) (1650–1717), English academic administrator and clergyman
 William Lancaster (anthropologist) (1938–2022), British social anthropologist studying various Arab tribes and communities
 William Lancaster (cricketer) (1873–1938), English cricketer
 William Lancaster (politician) (1841–1929), English politician and benefactor
 William H. Lancaster (born 1931), member of the California State Assembly
 William Edward Lancaster (1909–2003), chief executive of the Royal Zoological Society of South Australia
Willie Lancaster, Scottish footballer
 Bill Lancaster (1947–1997), American screenwriter
 Bill Lancaster (aviator) (1898–1933), British aviator